Eleanor Suzanne Daniel (born June 11, 1950), also known by her married name Ellie Drye, is an American former competition swimmer, four-time Olympic medalist, and former world record-holder.

As a teenager, Daniel trained with coach Mary Freeman Kelly at the Vesper Boat Club in Philadelphia.  In her second year, she came in eighth in the 1,500-meter freestyle at the AAU national championships.  Afterward, she switched to the butterfly stroke, which came naturally to her because she was double-jointed in her back and her strength was in her shoulders, and won seven national championships.  At the 1967 Pan American Games in Winnipeg, Manitoba, she won gold medals in the 100-meter butterfly (1:05.24), and swimming the butterfly leg in the 4×100-meter medley relay with her teammates Kendis Moore (backstroke), Catie Ball (breaststroke), and Wendy Fordyce (freestyle) (4:30.0).

Daniel represented the United States at the 1968 Summer Olympics in Mexico City, where she competed in three events.  She received a gold medal by swimming the butterfly leg for the winning U.S. team in the women's 4×100-meter medley relay, together with teammates Kaye Hall (backstroke), Catie Ball (breaststroke), and Sue Pedersen (freestyle).  The American women set a new Olympic record of 4:28.3, defeating the Australians (4:30.0) and West Germans (4:36.4).  In individual competition, she won a silver medal in the 100-meter butterfly, and a bronze medal in the 200-meter butterfly.

She received a bronze medal in 200-meter butterfly at the 1972 Summer Olympics in Munich, Germany.  She also competed in the 100-meter butterfly, finishing sixth in the event final.

Daniel is a graduate of the University of Pennsylvania.  She is currently a prosecutor with the Los Angeles County District Attorney's office.

She held the 200-meter butterfly (long course) world record (2:18.4) from August 1971 to August 1972.  Daniel was inducted into the International Swimming Hall of Fame as an "Honor Swimmer" in 1997.

See also

 List of Olympic medalists in swimming (women)
 List of University of Pennsylvania people
 World record progression 200 metres butterfly
 World record progression 4 × 100 metres medley relay

References

External links
 

1950 births
Living people
American female butterfly swimmers
World record setters in swimming
Medalists at the 1968 Summer Olympics
Medalists at the 1972 Summer Olympics
Olympic bronze medalists for the United States in swimming
Olympic gold medalists for the United States in swimming
Olympic silver medalists for the United States in swimming
Penn Quakers women's swimmers
Swimmers from Philadelphia
Swimmers at the 1967 Pan American Games
Swimmers at the 1968 Summer Olympics
Swimmers at the 1972 Summer Olympics
Pan American Games gold medalists for the United States
Pan American Games medalists in swimming
Universiade medalists in swimming
Universiade bronze medalists for the United States
Medalists at the 1970 Summer Universiade
Medalists at the 1967 Pan American Games